The following is a list of football stadiums in Albania, ranked by seating capacity. The minimum capacity is 1,000.

Current stadiums

Demolished stadiums
Stadiums which have been demolished and no longer exist.

See also
List of association football stadiums by capacity
List of European stadiums by capacity

List
Albania
stadiums
Stadiums
Albania